The ochre-fronted antpitta (Grallaricula ochraceifrons) is a species of bird in the family Grallariidae. It is endemic to Peru.

Its natural habitat is subtropical or tropical moist montane forest. It is threatened by habitat loss.

References

External links
BirdLife Species Factsheet.

ochre-fronted antpitta
Birds of the Peruvian Andes
Endemic birds of Peru
ochre-fronted antpitta
Taxonomy articles created by Polbot